Latin Carga (legally Latinoamericana Aerea de Carga) was a Venezuelan cargo airline that operated from 1963 to 1980. It operated different types of aircraft, from turboprops to jetliners.

History
The airline began flying in 1963, as Tigres Voladores (Flying Tigers). In 1972, the airline changed its name to Latin Carga.

Destinations

Oranjestad (Queen Beatrix International Airport)

Barranquilla (Ernesto Cortissoz International Airport)

Kingston (Norman Manley International Airport)

Panama City (Tocumen International Airport)

Miami (Miami International Airport)

Caracas (Simon Bolivar International Airport) Hub
Maracaibo (La Chinita International Airport)
Porlamar (Santiago Mariño Caribbean International Airport)
Puerto Ayacucho (Cacique Aramare Airport)

Fleet
The airline operated a number of different aircraft:

1 Convair CV-880
11 Curtiss C-46 Commando
1 Douglas C-47A Skytrain
1 Douglas DC-6A
1 Douglas DC-6B
1 Douglas DC-7C

Incidents and accidents
On December 5, 1972, a Curtiss C-46 Commando (registered YV-C-TGE), flying from Kingston to Barranquilla, was damaged beyond repair when it force landed in trees, 10 kilometers from Ernesto Cortissoz International Airport. All 3 crew members were not injured.

On November 3, 1980, a Latin Carga Convair CV-880 crashed on take-off from Simon Bolivar International Airport, resulting in the deaths of 4 occupants, and total destruction of the aircraft. The aircraft involved (registered YV-145C) had flown from 1962 to January 1974 for Delta Air Lines of the United States and was retired by that airline, then sold to Latin Carga in 1979.

See also
List of defunct airlines of Venezuela

References

Airlines established in 1963
Airlines disestablished in 1980
Defunct cargo airlines
Defunct airlines of Venezuela
1980 disestablishments in Venezuela
Venezuelan companies established in 1963